Predator: Concrete Jungle is a 2005 action video game developed by Eurocom for the PlayStation 2 and Xbox consoles. In the game the player controls a disgraced Predator who must regain his honor by killing the humans who have stolen his technology. The game is named after the first volume of the Dark Horse Comics Predator comics series, but does not share the same plot.

Gameplay
The game also has several bonus missions in which the player can earn rewards including costumes, weapons, and increased health and energy. A variety of weapons are used in the game, falling into the categories of melee and ranged weapons. A number of the weapons reflect those used in the Predator and Alien vs. Predator films, though others are new. The player can also use mines and bombs. Weapon upgrades are found in some of the stages. The player can also use items, such as medical kits which restore health. In first-person mode, the player can use vocal mimicry to distract or lure an enemy, while in third-person mode the player can emit a roar. During gameplay, the Predator generally emits lion, tiger, leopard, and jaguar growls.

Plot

The game opens in 1930, in New Way City. The player controls a Predator who stalks and kills Mafia boss Bruno Borgia and members of his gang who are at war with the Irish Mob. Bruno's wife Isabella shoots the Predator in the eye, causing his blood to splatter on her and her newborn son Hunter. The Predator makes a hasty escape, leaving behind some of his equipment. As he attempts to reach his ship, the roof he is running across collapses - leaving him incapacitated. The Predator then sets off his ship's self-destruct sequence; however, this fails to kill him as he is outside the range of the explosion. Shamed by defeat and having exposed his race to the humans, the Predator is exiled by his clan to a planet inhabited by deadly alien creatures. One hundred years later, the Predator, now called Scarface, is offered a chance for redemption.

The Predator technology, derived from Scarface's abandoned equipment, has proliferated into the hands of Bruno's descendants and warring gangs who have utilized it in New Way City, now known as Neonopolis - City of Light, as well as against other Predators. The warring factions all pay tribute to Lucretia Borgia, daughter of Hunter and granddaughter of Bruno. Thus, Scarface regains his honor by battling the various factions in order to recover the Predator technology (known to the humans as "Prometheus" technology). Wiping out the Haitian voodoo gang Les Serviteurs (who were using Predator cloaking devices) and the violent drug dealers called The Dead Men (who were dealing in Prometheus weapon tech), Scarface takes the skull of Serviteur houngan King Willie and the skulls of the Dead Men Triad. Following this, Scarface proceeds to infiltrate the private island of former Italian Mafia leader Don Giovanni. After disabling the defenses and shielding around the island, Scarface aids the juvenile Pack-9 gang, who use a Ulysseus android they've stolen from the police, to break into the Don's mansion. Inside, Scarface proceeds to wipe out both groups, killing Don Giovanni and taking the head of his bodyguard, Vincent di Angelo, as a trophy.

Scarface finally targets the Mexican-American gang Los Matadores, led by Fidel "El Hongo" Perez. After seeing his Matadores gun dealers killed, El Hongo asks Lucretia Borgia for help, but is rebuffed. However, with the death of the Matadores prostitutes and pimps, El Hongo again asks for her help to save him from "El Demonio Invisible". Lucretia sends a group of mechanically-enhanced Russian Mercenaries known as the Machine Men—led by Viktor the Chechen—to New Way Field to deal with Scarface. However, the four mercenaries are butchered by Scarface, who takes Viktor's head for himself. Lucretia is shocked when El Hongo later calls her to tell her the Machine Men have been killed, and she sends El Hongo to a high-security black market trading depot at the docks, which is protected by Borgia Black Ops crew The Working Girls, led by Baby Blew. Despite his cloak being disabled by jamming equipment, Scarface infiltrates the facility and destroys the generators for the jamming tech as well as a shipment of Prometheus weapons before finally killing El Hongo and later Baby Blew.

Scarface rides one of the drone trucks to the weapon depot, infiltrating the facility and destroying it. However, his true origin has been discovered by Lucretia after seeing him on camera, and several waves of The Monster Squad—genetically altered cyborgs—are deployed. Despite valiantly fighting the Monster Squad (taking the skulls of the first wave), Scarface is overpowered and taken back to the Borgia labs. Scarface suffers flashbacks to his hunt for Bruno 100 years ago, including tracking Bruno to the New Way Museum, killing corrupt Police Chief O'Brien alongside many mob members and police officers before his final confrontation with Bruno, which saw the "New Way Devil" take the head of the "God of Gangsters" before showing it to Borgia's wife, Isabella. Due to an underestimated anesthetic dose, Scarface breaks free and recovers his equipment, freeing some of his captured brethren in his escape.

Following instructions from MOTHER, the computer controlling Neonopolis, Lucretia activates the weather stations to make it rain so Scarface can't use his cloak while unleashing three brainwashed 'bad blood' predators against him. Despite this, Scarface kills two of the bad bloods — Swift Knife and Long Spear — and disables the weather machines. Working his way towards Lucretia's penthouse, Scarface battles wave upon wave of enemy forces including Lucretia's three Ronin Bodyguards—samurai who are trained in "ten thousand ways to kill". Scarface defeats them but they escape before he can finish them off, jumping onto Lucretia's car as she flees.

Lucretia heads for Borgia Towers, with Scarface following and killing everyone and everything in his way, including another wave of the Monster Squad and the final bad blood Predator, Stone Heart. Eventually, it is revealed that MOTHER is actually Isabella who, along with her son, have aged slowly and been kept alive by Scarface's blood.

She reveals both herself and Hunter have been kidnapping and experimenting on Predators to extend their lives further. As Scarface confronts Isabella, she activates a shield and unleashes a hive of Xenomorphs against Scarface. Despite this, Scarface disables the generators and wipes out the hive, leaving Isabella defenseless. Isabella reveals her unnatural love for Scarface - saying that Hunter was just a 'stunted weakling' without him. However, Scarface impales her with his Combi-Stick, killing her.

Lucretia runs to her father, discovering to her horror that Hunter has used the Predator's genetic data to slowly transform into a hybrid of Human and Predator. An aggravated Hunter kills Lucretia before Scarface battles Hunter. Lucretia's ronin bodyguards sacrifice themselves to avenge her and assist Scarface in a final battle against Hunter on top of Borgia Towers and finally onto a statue of Bruno Borgia, with Scarface eventually emerging the victor. Scarface uses Hunter's artificial Predator blood to paint his clan sign on the statue of Bruno Borgia before being recovered by his clan on a ship.

In the epilogue, Lucretia is revealed to have survived and been recovered by the recently merged Weyland and Yutani corporations, who have installed her as the new MOTHER computer controlling Neonopolis.

Cast

 Aimée Leigh and Sarah Brown as Scarface / The Predator (sound effects)
 Tasia Valenza as Isabella Borgia / MOTHER
 Giselle Loren as Lucretia Borgia
 Fred Tatasciore as Bruno Borgia
 Armando Valdes-Kennedy as El Hongo
 David Sobolov as Hunter Borgia

Development
Predator: Concrete Jungle makes several links between the films of the Alien, Predator, and Alien vs. Predator franchises. The film Predator 2 also featured a powerful Jamaican gang with a leader named King Willie. Hunter mentions to Lucretia that he knew Charles Bishop Weyland "before he disappeared"; Weyland appeared in the film Alien vs. Predator (2004) leading an expedition to the Antarctic, where he was killed by a Predator. The Yutani Corporation is also mentioned, referencing the Weyland-Yutani Corporation of the Alien films. MOTHER, the name of the computer controlling New Way City/Neonopolis in 2030, is also the name of the Nostromo's computer intelligence in Alien (1979). Several other references to the film franchises are made throughout the game, including the appearance of Aliens.

Reception

The game received "generally unfavorable reviews" on both platforms according to the review aggregation website Metacritic. IGN called it "a good idea gone bad", and cited the game's poor controls and awkward gameplay as factors. Similarly, GameSpot criticized the game's storyline and graphics.

References

Notes

External links
 

2005 video games
Action video games
Predator (franchise) games
PlayStation 2 games
Video games developed in the United Kingdom
Video games set in 1930
Video games set in 2030
Video games set in the United States
Sierra Entertainment games
Fox Interactive games
Xbox games
Xbox 360 games
Cyberpunk video games
Eurocom games
Single-player video games